Padre José Luis Borga (born Lapas, Torres Novas, 19 November 1964) is a Portuguese Roman Catholic priest and Christian contemporary musician. In 10 years, he has released six CDs, two of which reached Platinum, one a Double Platinum and one Gold.

Albums
 Navegação
 Noite De Paz
 Cantar É Rezar Duas Vezes
 Que Fésta?! - featuring O sol já raiou and other songs.
 Alegrai-vos
 10 Anos A Cantar o que é preciso

References

21st-century Portuguese Roman Catholic priests
Living people
Performers of Christian music
21st-century Portuguese male singers
Portuguese pop singers
People from Torres Novas
1964 births